The Colonials is a synchronized ice skating team from West Acton, Massachusetts. The Colonial's junior team received second place at the junior world qualifier in 2007, allowing the team to be a part of the world junior team.

References

External links
Colonials' Home Page

Synchronized skating teams